Farmers Valley is an unincorporated community in Keating Township, McKean County, Pennsylvania, United States, situated between Coryville and Smethport.

References 

Unincorporated communities in McKean County, Pennsylvania
Unincorporated communities in Pennsylvania